The Strathcona Refinery is an oil refinery located in Strathcona County adjacent to Edmonton, Alberta, Canada, owned by Imperial Oil.  The refinery provides oil products, primarily gasoline, aviation fuel, diesel, lubricating oils, petroleum waxes, heavy fuel oil and asphalts. 

The refinery was built in 1975 and replaced older refineries in Edmonton, Regina, Winnipeg, and Calgary.

A fire occurred at the refinery in 2007 that resulted it in temporarily operating at reduced capacity.

Avgas contamination
On February 15, 2018 Imperial Oil Limited the Canadian subsidiary of U.S. petroleum company ExxonMobil and sole producer of Avgas in Canada announced that it had notified Transport Canada that it was immediately ceasing all production of AVGas produced at the Strathcona Refinery  due to quality issues, specifically that "the product quality issue may cause interference with on-board fuel gauge sensors of aircraft using avgas." Imperial also sent out warnings to airport FBOs about the quality issues and ordered that all sales of Avgas since December 28, 2017 be stopped and the fuel in question be quarantined until Imperial can make arrangements to have the fuel returned to the refinery. As a result many small aircraft have been left stranded at airports across Canada until fuel supplies from neighboring U.S. can be delivered.

See also
 Husky Lloydminster Refinery, Lloydminster (Husky Energy), 
 Scotford Upgrader, Strathcona County (Shell Oil Company), 
 Strathcona Refinery, Strathcona County (Imperial Oil), 
 Sturgeon Refinery, Sturgeon County (North West Redwater Partnership — Canadian Natural Resources and North West Refineries),    
 Suncor Edmonton Refinery, Strathcona County (Suncor Energy),

External links
 Company Web-site

References

Oil refineries in Canada
Buildings and structures in Alberta
ExxonMobil buildings and structures
Sherwood Park
1975 establishments in Alberta